The National Consumer Law Center (NCLC) is an American nonprofit organization headquartered in Boston, Massachusetts, specializing in consumer issues on behalf of low-income people. Legal services, government and private attorneys, as well as community organizations, work with the center to advocate for consumer reform.

The NCLC primarily researches consumer law in the United States and writes books for consumer lawyers and other legal advocates working on behalf of low income individuals. The NCLC does not take cases for or represent individual consumers.

On February 26, 2019, the NCLC testified before the U.S. House of Representatives Committee on Financial Services regarding “Who’s Keeping Score? Holding Credit Bureaus Accountable and Repairing a Broken System”.

Controversies 
The NCLC supported an effort by the state of Connecticut when they attempted to fine the chairman of the Otoe-Missouria tribe for violating state rules on interest rates. One Native American advocacy group was quoted as saying opponents of tribal lending are promoting a "false, and often racist narrative."

References

External links
 
 NCLC page on Charity Navigator
 NCLC page on Candid

Political advocacy groups in the United States
Consumer organizations in the United States